Issa Baradji (born 15 June 1995) is a French-born Malian footballer who plays as a forward for Bobigny AC.

Club career
Baradji made his Ligue 1 debut on 22 March 2014 against Valenciennes FC in a 3–2 away win scoring the two last goals of the game.

In January 2015, he signed with Belgian side R. White Star Bruxelles.

International career
Baradji was born in France and is of Malian and Ivorian descent. Baradji was called up to the Mali national under-20 football team for the 2016 Toulon Tournament, and made his debut in a 1–0 loss to the Czech Republic U20s as a 51-minute sub.

References

External links
 
 

Living people
1995 births
Sportspeople from Créteil
Association football forwards
Citizens of Mali through descent
Malian footballers
Malian expatriate footballers
Mali under-20 international footballers
French footballers
French sportspeople of Malian descent
AC Ajaccio players
RWS Bruxelles players
SR Colmar players
Red Star F.C. players
Gil Vicente F.C. players
Trélissac FC players
Entente Feignies Aulnoye FC players
Ligue 1 players
Ligue 2 players
Championnat National 2 players
Championnat National 3 players
Challenger Pro League players
Malian expatriate sportspeople in Belgium
Malian expatriate sportspeople in Portugal
Expatriate footballers in Belgium
Expatriate footballers in Portugal
Footballers from Val-de-Marne